The New York Knickerbockers, better known as the New York Knicks, are a professional basketball team based in New York City that competes in the National Basketball Association (NBA). An original member of the NBA, the Knicks play in the Eastern Conference's Atlantic Division. In its 76 seasons, the franchise has reached the NBA Finals eight times and won two championships. As of the end of the 2021–22 season, New York has won more than 2,800 regular season games, and the team has the fifth-highest victory total in NBA history. Since 1968, the Knicks have played home games at Madison Square Garden.

One of the Basketball Association of America's (BAA) eleven teams during its inaugural season, the Knicks won the league's first game, defeating the Toronto Huskies 68–66 on November 1, 1946. The club qualified for the playoffs in the league's first three seasons before the BAA merged with the National Basketball League in 1949 to form the NBA. Following the merger, New York extended its streak of playoff appearances to nine consecutive years, and reached the NBA Finals each year from 1952 to 1954. The Knicks returned to the Finals in 1970 and defeated the Los Angeles Lakers in seven games for the team's first title. New York and Los Angeles faced each other again in the 1972 Finals, a series that the Lakers won four games to one. The Knicks earned their second NBA championship the following year, as they won a rematch with Los Angeles in five games.

From 1988 to 2001, the franchise reached the playoffs in fourteen consecutive seasons, but did not win an NBA title. The team reached its first NBA Finals in twenty-one seasons during the 1993–94 season, but lost to the Houston Rockets in seven games. Five years later, New York again lost in the NBA Finals, this time in a five-game series against the San Antonio Spurs. After the 2000–01 season, the Knicks had nine consecutive losing seasons between 2001–02 and 2009–10. The Knicks made the postseason in the next three seasons, but declined to their worst-ever record of 65 losses in 2014–15, a mark they matched in 2018–19. In the most recent season, 2021–22, New York missed the playoffs with a 37–45 win–loss record.

Table key

Seasons

All-time records

Notes

References
General

Specific

seasons
New York Knicks seasons